Kuleba is a Ukrainian surname. Notable people with the surname include: 

 Dmytro Kuleba (born 1981), Ukrainian politician, Minister of Foreign Affairs
 Oleksiy Kuleba (born 1983), Ukrainian politician, Governor of Kyiv Oblast

See also
 

Ukrainian-language surnames